The M550 (sold as the M551 in North America) was a phone produced by the now defunct Sendo. It is a compact color mobile phone which features a smaller monochrome screen on the front. It features WAP support with color pictures and three games: Splat 2, TenPin and KombatKlub. It comes in a flip flop design and is available in a variety of front colors including blue, black, red and grey. The screen at the front is used for displaying the time and network info.

It was sold in Germany at the discounter Aldi under the name Tevion MD 7300.

References

External links
Sendo M550
Softpedia page with reviews and technical details

M550